Belisarius was launched in Massachusetts in 1781. The British Royal Navy captured later that year and took her into service as HMS Bellisarius. She captured several American privateers, including one in a single ship action, before the Navy sold her in 1784. Her new owners sailed her as a merchantman between London and British Honduras. In 1787 she carried emigrants to Sierra Leone for the Committee for the Relief of the Black Poor, before returning to trading with Honduras. She was wrecked in September 1787.

Privateer
Belisarius was a privateer built by "Mr. Paul", launched in 1781, and fitted at Boston. She was a fast, miniature frigate or quarterdeck sloop. On 6 May 1781 she sailed on her first cruise.

In July Belisarius sailed in company with Aurora, but the two ships separated.

Belisarius was under the command of Captain James Munro, when  captured her on 7 August 1781, off the Delaware River. She was described as "a very fast-sailing Frigate of 26 Guns and 147 Men, belonging to Salem."  and  shared in the capture. Reportedly, the privateer Virginia also participated in the capture.

Belisarius arrived at New York City of 12 August.

HMS Bellisarius
The Royal Navy purchased Belisarius and commissioned her as the sixth rate HMS Bellisarius on 29 August 1781 under Captain Richard Graves.

In late 1781 or January 1782 Bellisarius captured the 12-gun Venus, off Boston. 

On March 13 1782, Bellisarius and Pandora captured the sloop Louis, bound to Virginia, taken off the Capes of Virginia. She was carrying cyder and onions.

On April 21, Bellisarius captured the brig Fox, bound to Havana, off Cape Hattrass. Fox was carrying a cargo of flour. 

On 12 May Bellisarius captured the privateer Chance, of Providence, Rhode Island, Daniel Ahorn, master, and 12 guns and 60 men. 

On 18 May Bellisarius captured the schooner 'Swordfish, which was carrying a cargo of flour and lumber. Swordfish'[, Charles Collins, master, was from Warren, Rhode Island.

On 18 May Bellisarius captured the privateer Sampson, Captain David Brooks, of New London, and eighteen 6-pounder guns and 130 men. 

On 3 June Bellisarius and  captured the privateer Pilgrim.

On 8 July Bellisarius, and the privateer Tyger captured the galley Comte de Grasse. Comte de Grasse had been sailing in ballast.
    
On 7 December Bellisarius captured the brig Harlequin. 

On 14 February 1783 Bellisarius captured the ship Tartar. Tartar was a privateer of twenty 9-pounder guns, under the command of Captain John Cathcart; earlier, she had belonged to the Massachusetts Navy. Tartar was sailing for Virginia and in company with another Massachusetts privateer, Alexander, Captain John Foster Williams, when they encountered Bellisarius. Both privateers attempted to flee, with Alexander, succeeding. Bellisarius caught up with Tartar at about 11p.m. and an exchange of broadsides began. After an hour-and-a-quarter, Cathcart struck. British casualties were three men killed and four wounded; American losses are unknown. Bellisarius put a prize crew aboard Tartar and the two vessels arrived at New York city on 28 February. The Vice admiralty court condemned Tartar and she was sold in mid-March.

Bellisarius arrived at Deptford on 10 October 1783 and was paid off in November. The Navy sold her at Deptford on 2 December for £855.

Merchantman
Bellisarius first appeared in Lloyd's Register (LR) in the volume for 1784.

On 13 March 1784 Captain Lucius O'Brien sailed from Gravesend for the "Musquito Shore". He died on the voyage. On 6 October Bellisarius, Mayor, master, arrived at Portsmouth from the Musquito Shore.

On 11 January 1787, Atlantic, Muirhead, master, and Belisarius, Sill, master sailed from Gravesend, bound for Sierra Leone. Vernon delayed leaving London to take on some more migrants, but then sailed to join the other two vessels and their escort at Portsmouth.

Bad weather forced them to divert to Plymouth, during which time about 50 passengers died. Another 24 were discharged, and another 23 ran away. Eventually, with some more recruitment, 411 passengers sailed to Sierra Leone in April 1787. 

Atlantic, Bellisarius, and Vernon, Gill, master, sailed from Portsmouth on 23 February under escort by the sloop-of-war HMS Nautilous.

The four vessels were reported to have been safe at Tenerife on 24 April and had been expected to sail to Sierra Leone that night. Ninety-six passengers died on the voyage from Portsmouth to Sierra Leone.

Loss
On 2 September 1787 Bellisarius was driven ashore during a hurricane and wrecked at the mouth of the Belize River, British Honduras.

Citations and references
Citations

References
  Henry,
 

1781 ships
Ships built in Massachusetts
Captured ships
Sixth rates of the Royal Navy
Age of Sail merchant ships of England
Maritime incidents in 1787
Privateer ships of the United States